Eimeria brunetti is a species of Eimeria that causes hemorrhagic intestinal coccidiosis in poultry worldwide. Lesions are limited to lower small intestine.

References 

Conoidasida